The 2014 Indoor Pan American Cup was the sixth edition of the Indoor Pan American Cup. It were held from 7 to 12 April 2014 in Montevideo, Uruguay. Five teams competed in the men's tournament while four teams competed in the women's tournaments. Canada, the winners of both tournament qualified for the 2015 Men's and Women's Hockey World Cup.

All times are local (UTC−03:00).

Men's tournament

Pool matches

Classification matches

Third and fourth place

Final

Final standings

References

Indoor Pan American Cup
2014
International field hockey competitions hosted by Uruguay
Pan American Cup